Jackson Emery (born June 22, 1987) is a former American basketball player who played for the BYU Cougars men's basketball team.

Emery was born in Salt Lake City and grew up in Alpine, Utah. He earned several accolades for his basketball performance in high school, leading his team to a state championship and being named Utah Mr. Basketball in 2005. Emery was recruited by nine schools for collegiate play and elected to attend Brigham Young University, which is sponsored by the Church of Jesus Christ of Latter-day Saints, of which he is a member. After his freshman year, he took a two-year hiatus to serve an LDS mission in Mexico, then returned to BYU. Emery is married, and finished his senior year serving as co-captain of the team alongside Jimmer Fredette and Logan Magnusson. In Emery's senior season, he was named the Mountain West Conference defensive player of the year. He holds both BYU's and the MWC's all-time season and career steal records.

Seeing virtually no interest from anyone in professional basketball, Emery ended his basketball career,  and began working for EcoScraps, a composting company. On 23 September 2011, he played in the Jimmer All-Star Game. Jackson currently works for Domo, a business intelligence software company based in American Fork, Utah. He serves as an Corporate Account Development Manager.

See also
 2008–09 BYU Cougars men's basketball team
 2009–10 BYU Cougars men's basketball team
 2010–11 BYU Cougars men's basketball team

References

External links

1987 births
Living people
Latter Day Saints from Utah
Basketball players from Salt Lake City
American men's basketball players
BYU Cougars men's basketball players
Shooting guards
American Mormon missionaries in Mexico